A hat-trick in cricket is when a bowler takes three wickets from consecutive deliveries. It is a relatively rare event in Twenty20 International (T20I) cricket with only 44 occurrences as of 26 February 2023.

The first Twenty20 hat-trick was taken by Brett Lee of Australia, playing against Bangladesh in Cape Town in September 2007. 

Rashid Khan, Lasith Malinga, Curtis Campher and Jason Holder are the only bowlers to take four wickets in four balls in T20Is, Khan achieving this feat against Ireland in February 2019, and Malinga repeating the achievement against New Zealand in September 2019. On 18 October 2021 at 2021 ICC Men's T20 World Cup, Campher achieved the feat against the Netherlands On 30 January 2022, Holder achieved this feat against England.

On 6 August 2021, Nathan Ellis picked up three wickets off the last three balls of Bangladesh innings to become the first male cricketer to take a hat-trick on his debut in a T20I match.

Chronological list of hat-tricks

Hat-tricks team wise

Players with multiple Twenty20 hat-tricks

See also 
 List of Test cricket hat-tricks
 List of One Day International cricket hat-tricks
 List of Twenty20 International records

References 

Cricket-related lists
Hattricks

Twenty20
Lists of cricket hat-tricks